Sonia Gechtoff (September 25, 1926 – February 1, 2018) was an American abstract expressionist painter. Her primary medium was painting but she also created drawings and prints.

Early life and education
Sonia Gechtoff was born in Philadelphia to Ethel (Etya) and Leonid Gechtoff. Her mother managed art galleries, including her own East and West gallery located at 3108 Fillmore Street in San Francisco. Her father was a highly successful genre artist from Odessa, Ukraine.  He introduced his daughter to painting and "had [her] sit beside him at his easel with a brush and paints and beginning at age six he was there to spur [her] on".

Gechtoff's talent was recognized early and she was put in a succession of schools and classes for artistically gifted children. She graduated from the Pennsylvania Academy of the Fine Arts with a B.F.A. in 1950.

Career
In 1951, Gechtoff relocated to San Francisco, sharing her social and professional life with Bay Area artists such as Hassel Smith, Philip Roeber, Madeline Dimond, Ernest Briggs, Elmer Bischoff, Byron McClintock, and Deborah Remington. She was immersed in the heady culture of the San Francisco Bay Area Beat Generation. According to Gechtoff, female abstract expressionists in San Francisco (such as Jay DeFeo, Joan Brown, Deborah Remington, and Lilly Fenichel) did not face the same discrimination as their New York counterparts. After moving she studied lithography with James Budd Dixon at what is now called the San Francisco Art Institute. She rapidly shifted to work as an Abstract Expressionist.
Some of her most well-known artwork was done in the Bay Area, including the lyrical Etya which is in the Oakland Museum of California.

Gechtoff married James "Jim" Kelly, another noted Bay Area artist, in 1953.

She gained national recognition in 1954, when her work was exhibited in the Guggenheim Museum's Younger American Painters show alongside Willem de Kooning, Franz Kline, Robert Motherwell, and Jackson Pollock.

Shortly after her mother Ethel died in 1958, Gechtoff and Kelly moved to New York, where they immediately became a part of the New York art world. She was represented by major New York galleries, among which were Poindexter and Gruenebaum, receiving consistently excellent reviews for her work. Teaching appointments and visiting professorships to New York University, Adelphi University, Art Institute of Chicago and the National Academy Museum and School, among others, were part of her professional life.

Aesthetics
As a teenager, Gechtoff was heavily influenced by Ben Shahn's style of social realism[5], an international political and social movement that drew attention to the struggles of the working class and the poor.

Gechtoff cited Clyfford Still's influence on her style (whom she met through her friend Ernie Briggs, but with whom she never studied). She took important lessons about line and shape from Still's work, and is sometimes referred to as a "second-generation Abstract Expressionist".

Her distinctive style emerged in the early 1950s: bright, bold works on "big" canvases.  Many of her works, like The Angel (1953–55), are abstracted self-portraits. Gechtoff used vibrant colors and thick, energetic brushstroke to suggest a central figure whose arms stretch across the picture plane. In 1956 she inaugurated her complex "hair" drawings, masses of line that tangled into wispy shapes that float on the paper. Her bold, swirling compositions won her a place in the United States Pavilion at the Brussels World's Fair in 1958.

Later in her career, after moving to New York, Gechtoff began drawing inspiration from the Brooklyn Bridge, classical architecture, and the sea, whose forms are recognizable in her later series of collage-like paintings. Gechtoff continued to develop her work throughout her career, never staying with one style. Always abstract, her work began to incorporate graphite after a switch to acrylics from oil.  The result has given a sense of linear rhythm to her work. She also developed an interest in doing a series of work on a theme as well as sets, multiple canvases comprising a single complete work. One of her final set of works is the six canvas series "Skip's Garden".

According to Charles Dean, whose collection of Abstract Expressionist prints was acquired by the Library of Congress, Gechtoff was "the most prominent woman working in California in the '50s".

Notable exhibitions

Group exhibitions
 USA Pavilion, Brussels World Fair: "17 American Painters", 1958 
 Museum of Modern Art, New York, 1977
 Guggenheim Museum, New York, "Younger American Painters 1954-55"
 Bella Pacifica-Bay Area Abstract Expressionism" at the Nyehaus Gallery, New York 2011
 "Women of Abstract Expressionism" at the Palm Springs Art Museum, Palm Springs, California  2017

Solo exhibitions
 Six Gallery, San Francisco, 1955
 De Young Museum San Francisco, 1957
 Ferus Gallery, Los Angeles, 1957,1959
 Poindexter Gallery, New York, 1959, 1960
 Gruenebaum Gallery, New York, Works on Paper, 1975-1987
 "The Ferus Years", Nyehaus Gallery, New York, 2011–12

Awards
 1963  – Ford Foundation Fellowship, Tamarind Lithography
 1988, 1994, 1998 – Pollock-Krasner Foundation Grant
 1989 – National Endowment for the Arts, Mid-Atlantic Grant
 1993 – Elected into the National Academy of Design
 2013 – Lee Krasner Lifetime Achievement Award

Public collections
 Metropolitan Museum of Art, New York, New York
 San Francisco Museum of Modern Art, San Francisco, California
 Museum of Modern Art, New York, New York
 Whitney Museum, New York, New York
 Menil Collection, Houston, Texas

References

Further reading

 "Drawings by Extraordinary Women", The Museum of Modern Art, July 22, 1977, No. 55.
 "The Cool Revival: Sonia Gechtoff in San Francisco", by Hirsch, Faye,  Art in America Magazine (on-line), 01/21/11.
 "Sonia Gechtoff at Her Best at Gruenebaum", by Kramer, Hilton,  The New York Times, January 8, 1982.
 Kramer, Hilton, "Reflections on Sonia Gechtoff", essay for Works on Paper, 1975–1987, a show at the Gruenebaum Gallery, 1987.
 "Sonia Gechtoff: Four Decades, 1956-1995: Works on Paper", Schick Art Gallery, Skidmore College, Saratoga Springs, New York, July 13-September 17, 1995.
 "Sonia Gechtoff: New Works January 5-February 13", Gruenebaum Gallery, Ltd, New York, 1982.
 "The Most Difficult Journey-The Poindexter Collection of American Modernist Painting", The University of Washington Press, 2002.
 "Can We Still Learn to Speak Martian?", by Yau, John,  April 29, 2012, in Hyperallergic, an on-line forum/newsletter

External links

 Archives of American Art, Sonia Gechtoff Papers
 Metropolitan Museum of Art
 San Francisco Museum of Modern Art
 The Whitney Museum of Art
 "Etya" at the Oakland Museum, California
 Examples of Sonia Gechtoff's Art on the Westbeth Artist Residence Web Site

2018 deaths
1926 births
Artists from Philadelphia
American abstract artists
Abstract expressionist artists
Modern painters
American women painters
20th-century American painters
20th-century American women artists
21st-century American painters
21st-century American women artists
New York University faculty